The IOOF Hall, which has also been known as Crest Theatre, is a two-story building in De Beque, Colorado that was built in 1900.  Its second floor's large lodge room served historically as a meeting hall for the Odd Fellows and corresponding Rebekahs groups.  First floor rooms of the building served variously as a theater with stage and orchestra pit for local and travelling shows, a community center, and a dance hall.  A small projection booth above the lobby, accessed by a steep stairway, was added for the Crest Theatre to begin operating in 1917.  Both floors have  ceilings and there is a stamped tin lining high on the second floor wall.

A 2013 photo (above) shows the stamped siding along the long South side of the building, painted but with rust streaks running down in a few spots. Its front facade includes stamped tin engaged columns and stamped tin panels including flowery patterns. At the top is "IOOF No 125" in raised letters.

The building was deemed significant for its association with social and entertainment history of De Beque, and also for its unique architecture including the stamped metal siding.

It was listed on the National Register of Historic Places in 1993.

References

External links

Theatres on the National Register of Historic Places in Colorado
Cultural infrastructure completed in 1900
Buildings and structures in Mesa County, Colorado
Odd Fellows buildings in Colorado
Clubhouses on the National Register of Historic Places in Colorado
National Register of Historic Places in Mesa County, Colorado